In law, fraud is  an intentional deception to secure unfair or unlawful gain, or to deprive a victim of a legal right. Fraud can violate civil law or criminal law, or it may cause no loss of money, property, or legal right but still be an element of another civil or criminal wrong. The purpose of fraud may be monetary gain or other benefits, for example by obtaining a passport, travel document, or driver's license, or mortgage fraud, where the perpetrator may attempt to qualify for a mortgage by way of false statements. In contrast, a hoax is a distinct concept that involves deliberate deception without the intention of gain or of materially damaging or depriving a victim.

Types 

 419, see 
 involves promising a victim a significant share of a large sum of money, in return for a small up-front payment, which the fraudster claims will be used to obtain the large sum.
 Asset diversion, see 
 Bait-and-switch
 Bankthe use of potentially illegal means to obtain money, assets, or other property owned or held by a financial institution, or to obtain money from depositors by fraudulently posing as a bank or other financial institution. The term applies to actions that employ a scheme or artifice, as opposed to bank robbery or theft.
 Bankruptcyconcealment of assets by a debtor to avoid liquidation in bankruptcy proceedings; may include filing of false information, or multiple filings in different jurisdictions.
 Benefits (U.K.)
 Billing
 Bride
 , Friendlywhere a consumer makes an online shopping purchase with their credit card, and then requests a chargeback from the issuing bank after receiving the purchased goods or services. Once the chargeback is approved, this cancels the financial transaction, and the consumer receives a refund of the money they spent, and the merchant can be held accountable for the chargeback amount.
 Charity
 , kiting, paper hanginga category that involves the unlawful use of checks in order to illegally acquire or borrow funds that do not exist within the bank account balance or account-holder's legal ownership.
 Communication, see 
 an attempt to defraud a person or group after first gaining their trust. They involve "voluntary exchanges that are not mutually beneficial", and benefit the fraudster ("con man") at the expense of the victim.
 Contract
 Conveyance, see 
 Counterfeiting
 Cramminga scheme in which small charges are added to a bill by a third party without the subscriber's consent or knowledge. These may be disguised as a tax, fee, or bogus service. The crammer's intent is that the subscriber will overlook and pay these small charges without dispute.
 Creative accounting
 Credit card and Carding
 Disabilitythe receipt of payment(s) intended for the disabled from a government agency or private insurance company by one who should not be receiving them, or the receipt of a higher amount than one is entitled to.
 Drug, see 
 any of several types of fraud in which older people are frequently targeted, including  economic abuse, and sweepstakes.
 , or election manipulation, voter fraud, vote riggingillegal interference with the process of an election, either by increasing the vote share of a favored candidate, depressing the vote share of rival candidates, or both.
 Email
 Embezzlement
 the attempt to defraud people seeking employment by giving them false hope of better employment, offering better working hours, more respectable tasks, future opportunities, or higher wages.
 Faked death
 Fee churning, see 
 Fertility the failure on the part of a fertility doctor to obtain consent from a patient before inseminating her with his own sperm.
 Foreign exchange, or "Forex"any trading scheme used to defraud stock traders by convincing them that they can expect to gain a high profit by trading in the foreign exchange market. (U.S., 2008)
 Forgery
 Fraud in the factumuse of misrepresentation to cause one to enter into a financial transaction without understanding the risks, duties, or obligations incurred.
 Friendly, see 
 entering into a stock trade or other securities transaction with foreknowledge of a large, nonpublic, pending transaction that will influence the price of the underlying security. See also .
 Health care, see 
 Hoax
 honest services
 Identity theft, Impersonationunauthorized use of another person's personal identifying information, such as name, identifying number, or credit card number (1964)
 any act committed to defraud an insurance process. It occurs when a claimant attempts to obtain some benefit or advantage they are not entitled to, or when an insurer knowingly denies some benefit that is due. See also .
 Internet
 
 Job
 Kiting, see 
 Long firm
 
 any act committed to defraud a legitimate lottery, such as a perpetrator attempting to win a jackpot prize through fraudulent means; or in the case of a stolen lottery ticket, to defraud an individual of their legitimately won prize.
 a type of  that takes the form of informing an individual by email, letter or phone call that they have won a lottery prize. The victim is instructed to pay a fee to enable the non-existent winnings to be processed.
 Mail and wire 
 Marriage
 Medicare
 when a trader assigns a value to securities that does not reflect what they are actually worth, due to intentional  mispricing,  allowing him to obtain a higher bonus from his employer, where the bonus is calculated as a percentage of the value of his securities portfolio. See also .
 Mortgage
 Nigerian prince, see 
 Odometerthe practice by the seller of a used vehicle of falsely representing the actual mileage of the vehicle to the buyer, by rolling back the odometer to make it appear that the vehicle has lower mileage than it actually does.
 Overpayment
 in parapsychology
 Paper hanging, see 
 Passport
 Paternity
 activity that results in false claims to insurers or programs such as Medicare in the United States or equivalent state programs for financial gain to a pharmaceutical company.
 , Communicationthe use of telecommunications products or services with the intention of illegally acquiring money from, or failing to pay, a telecommunication company or its customers.
 Premium diversion, see 
 Price fixing
 Push payment fraud
 the promotion of fraudulent or ignorant medical practices.
 Racketeering
 Recruitment fraud, see 
 Return
 
 Intellectual property
 Scientific
 
 Shill bidding
 Spyware
 Tailgating, see 
 Tax
 Tech support
 Telemarketingfraudulent selling conducted over the telephone. The term is also used for  not involving selling.
 Slamming
 Tobashi scheme
 an attempt to avoid debt by transferring money to another person or company, particularly with regard to insolvent debtors.
 Visa
 Vomit
 Voter, vote rigging, see 
 Welfare illegal abuse of a state welfare system by knowingly withholding or giving false information in order to obtain more funds than would otherwise be allocated.
 White-collar crime
 Wine
 Workmen's compensation, see

See also

 Fraud Advisory Panel
 Loss prevention
 National Fraud Intelligence Bureau
 Serious Fraud Office (United Kingdom)
 Theft of services
 Whistleblower

References

Further reading
 Edward J. Balleisen Fraud: An American History from Barnum to Madoff.  (2017). Princeton University Press.
 Fred Cohen Frauds, Spies, and Lies – and How to Defeat Them.  (2006). ASP Press.
 Green, Stuart P. Lying, Cheating, and Stealing: A Moral Theory of White Collar Crime. Oxford University Press, 2006. 
 Review Fraud – Alex Copola Podgor, Ellen S. Criminal Fraud, (1999) Vol, 48, No. 4 American Law Review 1.
 The Nature, Extent and Economic Impact of Fraud in the UK. February, 2007.
 The Fraudsters – How Con Artists Steal Your Money.  by Eamon Dillon, published September 2008 by Merlin Publishing
 Zhang, Yingyu. The Book of Swindles: Selections from a Late Ming Collection. Columbia University Press, 2017.

External links

 

Fraud
Fraud